The men's 4 × 100 metre freestyle relay competition of the swimming events at the 1971 Pan American Games took place on 7 August. The defending Pan American Games champion is the United States.

This race consisted of eight lengths of the pool. Each of the four swimmers completed two lengths of the pool. The first swimmer had to touch the wall before the second could leave the starting block.

Results
All times are in minutes and seconds.

Heats

Final 
The final was held on August 7.

References

Swimming at the 1971 Pan American Games